Agathia codina is a species of moth in the family Geometridae first described by Charles Swinhoe in 1892. It is found in the north-eastern parts of the Himalaya, Peninsular Malaysia, Sumatra and Borneo.

Subspecies
Agathia codina codina (Himalayas)
Agathia codina australis (Peninsular Malaysia, Sumatra and Borneo)

External links

Geometrinae
Moths of Asia
Moths described in 1892